Clepsydra may refer to:

 Clepsydra, an alternative name for a water clock. 
 In ancient Greece, a device (now called a water thief) for drawing liquids from vats too large to pour, which utilized the principles of air pressure to transport the liquid from one container to another.
 Clepsydra Geyser in the Lower Geyser Basin of Yellowstone
 Clepsydra (diatom), a genus of protists
 Klepsydra well on the Akropolis.